South 25th Street station is a light rail station on the Link's T Line in Tacoma, Washington, United States. The station officially opened for service on August 22, 2003, is located at the edge of downtown, and it serves several area parking garages, allowing commuters to ride for free to nearby destinations.

The station consists of a single side platform on the south side of the street, and facilitates transfers to buses on Pacific Avenue. It is located near the Brewery District. Artwork at this station consists mainly of large fishing lures on the roof of the station platform that move in the wind. This is to reflect the fishing lure manufacture that used to take place in the area.

References

Link light rail stations in Pierce County, Washington
Railway stations in the United States opened in 2003
2003 establishments in Washington (state)
Buildings and structures in Tacoma, Washington
Transportation in Tacoma, Washington